Ara River may refer to:

Arakawa River (disambiguation), several rivers in Japan
River Ara, Ireland

See also
Ara (disambiguation)
Ara Canal, a canal linking the Han River to the Yellow Sea
Rambi Ara, a river and major tributary to the River Jhelum